Tabler is an unincorporated community in eastern Grady County, Oklahoma. It is located at the western end of State Highway 39, where it meets U.S. Highway 62/277/SH-9.

Notable citizens
 Shug Fisher, actor, comedian, singer, songwriter, musician

References

Unincorporated communities in Grady County, Oklahoma
Unincorporated communities in Oklahoma